University of Benin (UNIBEN) is a public research university located in Benin City, Edo State, Nigeria. It is among the universities owned by the Federal Government of Nigeria and was founded in 1970.  The School currently has two campuses with fifteen faculties including a central library called the John Harris Library. The buildings in UNIBEN are sparsely built, they are not close to each other.

UNIBEN has a teaching hospital called University of Benin Teaching Hospital (UBTH).

History

The University of Benin was founded on 1 July, 1971. The National Universities Commission (NUC) has accredited faculties and departments in the university.

John Harris Library

The John Harris Library  is an academic library on the Ugbowo campus. The Library is named after a pioneer University librarian, John Harris. The parent institution of the library is the University of Benin which was founded in 1970 formerly called Institute of Technology.

The Library, which holds large volumes of collections in print and non print format, is situated directly opposite the clinical Student Hostel within the university premises. The books acquired and shelves in the library, covers all courses being offered in the university. it is headed by a University Librarian who oversees its affairs.

The John Harris Library was established through the promulgation of the Institute of Technology edict of 1970 but was accorded the status of a university by the National University Commission (NUC) the 1 July 1971. and John Harris was appointed the library.

College of Medical Sciences
The UNIBEN College of Medicine teaches medicine and awards a professional degree for physicians and surgeons. The College of Medical Sciences is made of three Schools and an Institute, namely:

School of Medicine
The School of Medicine was established in 1973, then the Faculty of Medicine to Medicine to run a 6-year Bachelor of Medicine and Bachelor of Surgery (MBBS) full-time degree program. The first Dean of the School was Professor T. Belo-Osagie. He was the Dean from 1973 to 1975. With the exit of Professor T. Belo-Osagie, Professor K. Diete-Koki became the Dean of the School. Since then, the School has had various Deans and Heads of Departments in the last 30 years. The immediate past Dean of the School was Prof. Dr. (med.) E. Oviasu while the present Dean is Professor Wilson E. Sadoh .

School of Basic Medical Science
The School of Basic Medical Science was established in December 2003, from the College of Medical Sciences and was finally launched in January 2004. The school undertakes undergraduate programs for B.Sc.

In addition, the school provides services for other schools within the college: Schools of Medicine and Dentistry as well as other Faculties in the university: Sciences and School of Pharmacy.

The School of Basic Medical Science has the following seven  departments: 
Anatomy 
Medical Biochemistry
Medical Laboratory Science
Nursing Science
Physiology
Physiotherapy
Radiography and Radiation Science.

School of Dentistry
The School of Dentistry coordinates courses and curricular within the College leading to the award of Bachelor of Dental Surgery (BDS) degree. The School of Dentistry, as it was known then, was established in 1976 and the first batch of students was admitted in the 1976/77 academic session. It was established as an integral part of the College of Medical Sciences in 1975 by an amendment to the Edict establishing the University of Benin. In 2012, with support from the International Federation of Endodontic Associations(IFEA), donations from the University of Texas at Houston School of Dentistry, and the Owen family, Dr. Mbachan Collins Okwen BDS. (Benin), DDS., MBA. introduced regenerative endodontics and modern microscopic endodontics at the University of Benin Teaching Hospital.

Vice chancellors 
 Kenneth Robson Hill,  pioneer Vice Chancellor
 T.M. Yesufu,  the first indigenous  Vice Chancellor
Grace Alele-Williams, Nigeria's first female vice-chancellor. She served  from 1985 to 1991
Andrew Onokheroraye
Anao
Emmanuel Nwanze
Osayuki Godwin Oshodin, 2009-2014
Faraday Osasere Orumwense,  2014- 2019
Lilian Salami, 2019–present

Notable alumni

 
 

 Enyinnaya Abaribe, politician from Abia State
 Oladipo Agboluaje, actor
 Emmanuel Agwoje, banker
 Aigboje Aig-Imoukhuede, co-founder Access Bank Plc and founder & chairman, Africa Initiative for Governance
 Josephine Anenih, lawyer and former minister
 Helen Asemota, professor of biochemistry and biotechnology
 Lota Chukwu, actress
 George Edozie, artist
 Mitchell Elegbe, GMD/CEO Interswitch
 Abiodun Falodun, rector, Edo State Polytechnic
 Babatunde Fashola, former Lagos State governor, who served two terms from May 29, 2007, to May 29, 2015, and current minister of Power, Work & Housing in Nigeria
 James Ibori, former Governor of Delta State from 29 May 1999 to 29 May 2007
 Tom Ilube, founder and CEO, Crossword Cybersecurity
 Wellington Jighere, 2015 WESPA Scrabble champion
 Patience Maseli, first female deputy director of Upstream Division at the Department of Petroleum Resources
Richard Mofe-Damijo, Nollywood actor
 Darlington Obaseki, medical doctor and professor
Omoni Oboli, a Nigerian actress, film director  and producer
 Bright Okpocha ("Basketmouth"), comedian
Suyi Davies Okungbowa, author and scholar
 Ovie Omo-Agege, senator in the Nigerian eighth senate
 Osonye Tess Onwueme, writer and professor
 Victor F. Peretomode, academic and professor
 Benedict Peters, founder of Aiteo group
 Amaju Pinnick, President Nigeria Football Federation
 Ijeoma Uchegbu, scientist and professor
 Emmanuel Uduaghan, former governor, Delta State
 Sabina Umeh, singer
 John Obayuwana founder and managing director of Polo Luxury Ltd
Loretta Ogboro-Okor

Notable faculty
 Alexander Oppenheim (1973–1977), mathematician

Photo gallery

References

External links

 

Universities and colleges in Nigeria
Educational institutions established in 1970
University of Benin
1970 establishments in Nigeria
Public universities in Nigeria